The Maison Folie Moulins is a public building built for the event  Lille 2004, European capital of culture . It is located rue d´Arras in Lille- Moulins, a popular district of Lille.

Description 
The Maison Folie is housed in a former brewery of  18th-century, the Corman Vandame brewery, named after its owner from 1881 or the Trois Moulins brewery, closed in 1934. Rehabilitated by the architects Thierry Baron & Philippe Louguet., it reopened its doors in March 2004 to host concerts, shows, exhibitions, screenings, creative residencies and even meetings.

In 2014, the last building of the brewery, not rehabilitated in 2004, should offer new workspaces at Maison Folie. The buildings of the former Corman Vandame brewery are listed under "Monument historique' in France

Having become a municipal establishment after 2004, the Maison Folie Moulins has since developed an artistic project at the crossroads of disciplines. Thanks to the multiplicity of its spaces and the ambience of its interior courtyard, it creates a mix of proposals, artists and audiences, often in conjunction with many partners from the Lille Eurometropolis.

Bibliography 
 Page de la maison Folie Moulins sur le site web de Lille

See also
 Official site.

References 

Buildings and structures in Lille
Tourist attractions in Lille